Robert "Rob" Redding Jr. is an American podcaster, journalist, author and artist. From 2012 to 2013, he hosted the weekday syndicated Redding News Review on Sirius XM.

Personal life and education 
Redding's father was a preacher. His mother was a teacher in the Atlanta Public Schools. He was raised in the Atlanta area and attended the University of Louisiana where majored in speech communication. He graduated with a master's degree in communication from Marshall University in Huntington. He graduated with Master's in Fine Art in painting and drawing in 2022 from Pratt Institute in Brooklyn, New York. 

He is based in Brooklyn and is queer.

Journalism and teaching

Redding has taught communications at Pace University and New York City College of Technology. Prior to teaching, he was a talk radio broadcaster working afternoons at WAOK in Atlanta. He was named one of the "100 most important radio talk hosts in America."  He was a journalist at several newspapers including The Washington Times. He started his syndicated news and commentary show while at KMLB where he was also program director. He returned in radio syndication to WAOK and other cities a few years after leaving.

After about five years doing weekends, his show was also added to weekdays during that same time. The show was taken off the air at Sirius XM and continues as paid podcast Redding News Review Unrestricted hosted on Redding News Review website since 2014.<ref name="Radio Online">{{cite web |publisher=Radio Online |title=Redding News Review Unrestricted' Reaches 1000th Episode Image|url=https://news.radio-online.com/cgi-bin/rol.exe/headline_id=n35565}}</ref>

 Reporting and punditry 
In 2004, Redding reported on NBC anchor and managing editor Brian Williams saying that there were bigger issues than newsroom diversity. The comments resulted in a meeting between the National Association of Black Journalists and the NBC. In 2007, Redding broke news of racist threats made against black columnist Leonard Pitts. In May 2011, Redding got into a verbal altercation with Rush Limbaugh when he asked Michael Steele, the former chairman of the Republican National Committee, about a skit in which a Limbaugh staffer "reintepreted" his criticism of Barack Obama's immigration speech in ebonics.

In 2012, Redding was syndicated talk radio host on Sirius XM where he hosted "Where's the Change? Why Neither Obama nor the GOP Can Solve America's Problems," at Temple University and Connecticut College where he discussed the impact of talk radio on the 2012 presidential election. In 2013, Redding interviewed recording artist Stromae about racism in Europe. Stromae spoke frankly about being called a "monkey", which inspired the singers hit Formidable. In 2017, Redding's reported CoverGirl's James Charles comments about "chubby Black women", Indians and Mexicans in 2017 prompting Charles to apologise for his comments.

Redding's interview of Texas A&M University professor Tommy Curry resulted in over 80 death threats directed to Curry after his comments were misunderstood.

Redding occasionally features in the National Public Radio Roundtable feature.

 Writing 
Redding has written 13 self-published bestselling books on Amazon's hourly list, including Smeared, Target, Dark Soul and The Professor: Witnessing White Power (2019) ISBN 978-1692336233 Redding has two academic articles. He wrote "Black voices, White power: Members of the Black press make meaning of media hegemony" in the Journal of Black Studies He wrote the "Resolution of Risk" in “The Journal of the International Public Debate Association.” 

 Art 

In 2017, art reviewer Per Larson called his work "iconic" and compared him to "James Baldwin" because he once lived in Europe.

In 2018 he exhibited his first Manhattan solo show BIG BLACK ̶C̶O̶C̶K̶ CANVAS: SIZE matters - in ART! at the NoHoM55 Gallery in Chelsea in 2018. Redding's artwork Black Power: Unapologetically Militant was exhibited in the Fridman Gallery and later sold for $10,000. His work appeared in the May 2021 edition of Art in America.His "Constructive Expressionism" style was described as "highly original" by Black Star News, which covered his new book about his art called Smeared'' (2023).

References

External links
 Rob Redding official website
 Redding News Review website
 Rob Redding art site

African-American television personalities
African-American radio personalities
American infotainers
American male journalists
American online publication editors
American political commentators
American political writers
American talk radio hosts
American television talk show hosts
Living people
Marshall University alumni
The Washington Times people
21st-century African-American people
20th-century African-American people
Year of birth missing (living people)